Francis Charles Coppicus (9 March 1880 - 8 June 1966) was the general secretary of the Metropolitan Opera. He was the manager for Enrico Caruso, Feodor Chaliapin, and Maria Jeritza.

Biography
He was born on 9 March 1880 in  Neheim, Germany.

On 8 May 1909 he married Maybelle Louise Hogan in Manhattan.

On March 16, 1915 he became a citizen of the United States.

In 1916 he founded the Metropolitan Music Bureau. In 1930 six small concert bureaus merged into Columbia Artists Management.

He died on 8 June 1966 in Mill Valley, California.

References

Metropolitan Opera people
1880 births
1966 deaths
German emigrants to the United States